A team of Amateurs under the captaincy of Lord Hawke toured the West Indies in the 1896–97 season playing matches between January and April 1897. They played a total of 14 matches of which 7 are regarded as first class. They did not play in Jamaica.

Background
Lord Hawke had been invited to take the 1894–95 team to the West Indies but had had to withdraw, the team being captained instead by R. Slade Lucas. It was understood however that he would try to take a side out in 1896–97 and following an invitation he set about organising a tour. But his telegram accepting the invitation was never received and another group of tourists under A. A. Priestley having accepted an invitation from Jamaica were organising their own tour.

Lord Hawke met Priestley but the two could not come to a compromise and both decided to go independently. It would appear from the correspondence published that Lord Hawke treated Priestley in a rather high-handed manner.

Tour
A party of 12 was taken:

Lord Hawke, Captain
Mr. G. R. Bardswell
Mr. R. Berens
Mr. H. R. Bromley-Davenport
Mr. J. M. Dawson
Mr. C. Heseltine
Mr. A. E. Leatham
Mr. H. D. G. Leveson-Gower
Mr. W. H. Wakefield
Mr. P. F. Warner
Mr. A. D. Whatman
Mr. R. W. Wickham

Berens, Bromley-Davenport, Dawson and Wakefield had been in the Lucas tour to the West Indies two years previously. Bromley-Davenport had played regularly for Middlesex in 1896 and also against South Africa in 1895-96 but the other 3 had not played first-class cricket between the two tours. Whatman and Wickham had not played first-class cricket before the tour while Heseltine had played first-class cricket in 1895 but not in 1896. The remaining 5 had played first class cricket in 1896 and so, like Priestley's tourists, the team was somewhat stronger than Lucas's two years earlier. In 1896 Lord Hawke had played for Yorkshire, Bardswell for Oxford University and Lancashire, Leatham a single match for M.C.C., Leveson-Gower for Oxford University and a single match for Surrey and Warner for Oxford University and 4 matches for Middlesex. Lord Hawke and Heseltine had also played against South Africa in 1895-96. All the 12 played at least three first-class matches on the tour. Oscar Weber played in the last match of the tour against British Guiana. He had previously played for All West Indies against A.A. Priestley's XI. Mr. St. G.M. de Roebuck and Capt. Hon. M. Bourke played in a minor match.

The team left Southampton on January 13.

Matches played were:

 January 29, 30 : v Queen's Park C.C. (in Trinidad) 12-a-side
 February 1, 2, 3 : v Trinidad
 February 5, 6 : v Trinidad
 February 10, 11 : v St. George's C.C. (in Grenada) 12-a-side
 February 12, 13 : v Grenada
 February 15, 16, 17 : v St. Vincent
 February 25, 26, 27 : v Barbados
 March 2, 3, 4 : v Barbados
 March 11, 12 : v Antigua
 March 15, 16 : v St. Kitts
 March 19 : v St. Lucia
 March 26, 27, 29 : v British Guiana
 April 1, 2, 3 : v British Guiana
 April 12, 13, 14 : v British Guiana

First-class matches are highlighted.

Of the 7 first-class matches, 3 were won, 2 lost and 2 drawn. Overall 9 matches were won, 2 lost and 3 drawn. The tourists had a break from cricket between the last matches when they sailed up the Demerara river.

Warner was the great success amongst the batsmen scoring 984 runs including 4 centuries in all matches. Bardswell and Leveson-Gower were also successful in the first-class games.

Bromley-Davenport was the most successful bowler but missed a number of matches with a broken finger.

Averages
The following averages are in the 7 first class matches (Batting Bowling).

Batting

Weber was a local who played in other first class matches during the season.

Bowling

See also
A. A. Priestley's XI cricket team in the West Indies in 1896–97 for details of the other tour.

References

External sources
 CricketArchive
 Cricinfo - A Tale of Two Tours

Annual reviews
 James Lillywhite's Cricketers' Annual 1898 page 53
 Wisden Cricketers' Almanack 1898, pages 387 to 395

Further reading
 Peter Wynne-Thomas, The Complete History of Cricket Tours at Home & Abroad, Guild, 1989
 Cricket - A Weekly Record of the Game 1897

1897 in English cricket
1897 in West Indian cricket
1896-97
International cricket competitions from 1888–89 to 1918
West Indian cricket seasons from 1890–91 to 1917–18